Hendrik van Heuckelum (6 May 1879, The Hague – 28 April 1929, The Hague), nicknamed Henk, was a Dutch footballer who played as a forward for HBS-Craeyenhout and Royal Léopold Club, and who represented Belgium at the 1900 Summer Olympics, winning the bronze medal in the football tournament.

Biography
In his club career he played for both HBS-Craeyenhout in the Netherlands, and Royal Léopold Club in Belgium, finishing runner-up of the 1901-1902 Belgian championship with the letter after losing a tie-breaker to Racing Club de Bruxelles 3-4.

In 1900 he was a member of the Belgian team, which won the bronze medal in the football tournament. In those times it was common to play for another country. He played one match as a forward in which he scored one goal in a 2–6 loss to France, represented by Club Français.

Also in 1900, in addition to having the honor to participate in an Olympic Football event, van Heuckelum also had the honor to participate in the first-ever European club tournament, the 1900 Coupe Van der Straeten Ponthoz, as a Léopold player. However, the glory soon become an humiliation, as they were knocked out in the first round by the then Dutch champions HVV with a resounding 8-1 loss, being van Heuckelum who scored Léopold's consolation goal.

Honours

Club
Royal Léopold Club
Belgian championship:
Runner-up (1): 1901–02

International
Belgium
'''Olympic Games Bronze medal: 1900

References

External links

1879 births
1929 deaths
Dutch footballers
Belgian footballers
Olympic footballers of Belgium
Olympic bronze medalists for Belgium
Footballers at the 1900 Summer Olympics
Footballers from The Hague
Olympic medalists in football
Medalists at the 1900 Summer Olympics
Association football forwards